Events in 2003 in animation.



Events

January
 January 5: The Simpsons episode "Special Edna" premieres, guest starring singer and musician Little Richard.
 January 21: Walt Disney Studios Home Entertainment initially releases 101 Dalmatians II: Patch's London Adventure, directed by Jim Kammerud and Brian Smith.

February
 February 2: "The Strong Arms of the Ma", the 300th episode of The Simpsons, first airs.
 February 8: The first episode of the reboot of Teenage Mutant Ninja Turtles is broadcast.
 February 9: The first episode of Monkey Dust is broadcast.
 February 16: The first episode of The Venture Bros. is broadcast.
 February 20: Anime producer Yoshinobu Nishizaki is sentenced to two years and eight months in prison for the illegal possession of firearms, a case which happened in 1999.  He is released on 9 December 2007.
 February 24: The first episode of The Save-Ums! is broadcast.

March
 March 5: The first episode of Odd Job Jack is broadcast.
 March 9: The Simpsons episode "Mr. Spritz Goes to Washington" premieres, in which Krusty the Clown becomes a Republican. It became controversial for satirizing Fox News's news ticker.
 March 18: Charlotte's Web 2: Wilbur's Great Adventure is released, but was panned by critics by its animation and plot.
 March 21: The Walt Disney Company releases Piglet's Big Movie, directed by Francis Glebas.
 March 23: 75th Academy Awards: 
 Spirited Away, directed by Hayao Miyazaki and produced by Studio Ghibli, wins the Academy Award for Best Animated Feature. Miyazaki boycotts the event because of the U.S. involvement in the Iraq War and stays at home.
 The ChubbChubbs!, directed by Eric Armstrong and produced by Sony Pictures Imageworks, wins the Academy Award for Best Animated Short.

April
 April 6: The Futurama episode "The Why of Fry" premieres, guest starring actor and comedian Bob Odenkirk. It reveals that Fry's cryogenic freezing and arrival in the 31st century was not an accident, but a calculated plot by Nibbler to save the universe.
 April 7: Noggin was rebranded.
 Moose and Zee make their debuts.
 The first episode of the stop-motion version of Miffy and Friends is broadcast to critical acclaim.
 April 12: The first episode of All Grown Up! is broadcast. before its regular run began on November 9, 2003.

May
 May 7: Ray Harryhausen receives a star on the Hollywood Walk of Fame.
 May 18: During the Cannes Film Festival Interstella 5555: The 5tory of the 5ecret 5tar 5ystem, a Japanese-French animated feature film directed by Daisuke Nishio, Hirotoshi Rissen, Kazuhisa Takenouchi and Leiji Matsumoto, set to a soundtrack by Daft Punk, is released.
 May 30: The Walt Disney Company releases Finding Nemo, directed by Andrew Stanton.

June
 June 1: The Futurama episode "The Sting" premieres, in which a mission to collect space honey from deadly space bees leads to Fry's apparent death from bee stings.
 June 10: Larryboy: The Cartoon Adventures releases its final episode.
 June 11: Sylvain Chomet's The Triplettes of Belleville premiers.
 June 13: The first episode of The Grim Adventures of Billy & Mandy is broadcast.
 June 15: The Futurama episode "Three Hundred Big Boys" premieres, guest starring actress and comedian Roseanne Barr.
 June 25: Philippe Leclerc's The Rain Children premiers.
 June 26 – July 24: Ren & Stimpy "Adult Party Cartoon" is broadcast. It's a comeback of John Kricfalusi's original 1991–1995 Ren & Stimpy series, but with a more mature and darker tone. Both producers, advertisers and viewers dislike it, causing it to be cancelled after only a few episodes.

July
 July 2: Sinbad: Legend of the Seven Seas, the final traditionally animated DreamWorks film, premieres but becomes a massive flop which almost caused DreamWorks to shut down.
 July 11: The first episode of Spider-Man: The New Animated Series is broadcast.
 July 19: The first episode of Teen Titans is broadcast.

August
 August 1: The first episode of My Life as a Teenage Robot is broadcast.
 August 10: Futurama was abruptly cancelled after four seasons on Fox. It would later have a revival on Comedy Central in 2010.

September
 September 1: The first episode of Kid Paddle is broadcast.
 September 2: The first episode of Rubbadubbers is broadcast.
 September 3: The first episodes of Code Lyoko and Chilly Beach is broadcast.
 September 7: The first episode of Jakers! The Adventures of Piggley Winks is broadcast.
 September 8: The first episode of Connie the Cow is broadcast.
 September 16: The first episode of Auld Ones is broadcast.
 September 28: The first episode of JoJo's Circus is broadcast.

October
 October 10: Quentin Tarantino's Kill Bill: Volume 1 is released, which features an anime sequence, directed by Kazuto Nakazawa and produced by Production I.G.

November
 November 1: 
 The Walt Disney Company releases Brother Bear, directed by Aaron Blaise and Robert Walker.
 The first episodes of Xiaolin Showdown, Kenny the Shark, and Tutenstein are broadcast.
 November 2: The Simpsons episode "Treehouse of Horror XIV" premieres, guest starring actor Jerry Lewis.
 November 7: The first episode of Star Wars: Clone Wars is broadcast.
 November 9: Joe Dante's Looney Tunes: Back in Action is released.
 November 16: The Simpsons episode "The President Wore Pearls" premieres, guest starring filmmaker Michael Moore.
 November 23: The Simpsons episode "The Regina Monologues" premieres, where the family travels to the United Kingdom. It also guest stars J. K. Rowling, Ian McKellen and Prime Minister Tony Blair.
 November 27: The first episode of Pororo the Little Penguin is broadcast.

December
 December 3: Jacques-Rémy Girerd's Prophétie des Grenouilles (Raining Cats and Frogs) premiers.
 December 7: The Simpsons episode "Today I Am a Clown" premieres, guest starring Mr. T.
 December 16: One Froggy Evening and Tin Toy are added to the National Film Registry.

Specific date unknown
 The first episode of Pat & Mat is broadcast.
 The first episode of The Secret World of Benjamin Bear is broadcast.

Awards
 Academy Award for Best Animated Feature: Finding Nemo
 Animation Kobe Feature Film Award: Millennium Actress
 Annecy International Animated Film Festival Cristal du long métrage: My Life as McDull
 Annie Award for Best Animated Feature: Finding Nemo
 Goya Award for Best Animated Film: El Cid: The Legend
 Japan Media Arts Festival Animation Award: Winter Days
 Mainichi Film Awards – Animation Grand Award: Tokyo Godfathers

Films released

 January 21 - 101 Dalmatians II: Patch's London Adventure (United States)
 February 11 - Baby Looney Tunes' Eggs-traordinary Adventure (United States)
 February 12 - La Légende de Parva (France)
 February 14 - The Jungle Book 2 (United States)
 March 1 - One Piece: Dead End Adventure (Japan)
 March 4 - Scooby-Doo! and the Legend of the Vampire (United States)
 March 8 - Doraemon: Nobita and the Windmasters (Japan)
 March 18 - Charlotte's Web 2: Wilbur's Great Adventure (United States)
 March 20 - Little Longnose (Russia)
 March 21 - Piglet's Big Movie (United States)
 March 27 - The Little Polar Bear: The Dream of Flying (Germany)
 March 31 - Miss Spider's Sunny Patch Kids (Canada)
 April 18 - Hajime no Ippo – Champion Road (Japan)
 April 19:
 Crayon Shin-chan: The Storm Called: Yakiniku Road of Honor (Japan)
 Detective Conan: Crossroad in the Ancient Capital (Japan)
 April 20 - The Cunning Little Vixen (United Kingdom)
 April 25:
 Jake's Booty Call (United States)
 Oseam (South Korea)
 May 20:
 Atlantis: Milo's Return (United States)
 VeggieTales: The Wonderful World of Auto-Tainment! (United States)
 May 21 - Dominator (United Kingdom)
 May 28 - Interstella 5555: The 5tory of the 5ecret 5tar 5ystem (Japan and France)
 May 30 - Finding Nemo (United States)
 June 3:
 The Animatrix (United States and Japan)
 Rolie Polie Olie: The Baby Bot Chase (Canada and United States)
 June 4 - Kaena: The Prophecy (France and Canada)
 June 11 - The Triplets of Belleville (France, Belgium, Canada and United Kingdom)
 June 13 - Rugrats Go Wild (United States)
 June 25 - The Rain Children (France and South Korea)
 June 27 - Otherworld (United Kingdom)
 July 2 - Sinbad: Legend of the Seven Seas (United States)
 July 4 - El Embrujo del Sur (Spain)
 July 17:
 Werner – Gekotzt wird später! (Germany)
 Wonderful Days (South Korea and United States)
 July 19 - Pokémon: Jirachi—Wish Maker (Japan)
 August 5 - VeggieTales: The Ballad of Little Joe (United States)
 August 19 - Back to School with Franklin (Canada)
 August 20 - Hammerboy (South Korea)
 August 26 - Stitch! The Movie (United States)
 August 29 - Son of Aladdin (India)
 September 9 - Elysium (South Korea)
 September 16 - Bionicle: Mask of Light (United States)
 September 19 - Little Bee Julia & Lady Life (Italy)
 September 25 - Jester Till (Germany and Belgium)
 September 27 - G.I. Joe: Spy Troops (United States)
 September 30:
 Barbie of Swan Lake (United States)
 Scooby-Doo! and the Monster of Mexico (United States)
 October - The Legend of the Sky Kingdom (Zimbabwe)
 October 2 - Globi and the Stolen Shadows (Germany, Switzerland and Luxembourg)
 October 10 - Mécanix (Canada)
 October 21 - Batman: Mystery of the Batwoman (United States)
 October 22 - The Dog, the General, and the Birds (Italy and France)
 October 31 - Betizu izar artean (Spain)
 November - A Very Wompkee Christmas (United States)
 November 1 - Brother Bear (United States)
 November 8 - Tokyo Godfathers (Japan)
 November 14 - Looney Tunes: Back in Action (United States)
 November 18 - Rescue Heroes: The Movie (Canada)
 November 19 - Wizards & Giants (Mexico)
 November 20 - The Little Polar Bear: Nanouk's Rescue (Germany)
 November 27 - Winter Days (Japan)
 November 28 - Kim Possible: A Sitch in Time (United States)
 December 2 - The Land Before Time X: The Great Longneck Migration (United States)
 December 3 - Raining Cats and Frogs (France)
 December 5 - Opopomoz (Italy, France, and Spain)
 December 7 - Más vampiros en La Habana (Cuba and Spain)
 December 8 - My Little Pony: A Charming Birthday (United States)
 December 9:
 I Want a Dog for Christmas, Charlie Brown (United States)
 LeapFrog: The Letter Factory (United States)
 Recess: All Growed Down (United States)
  Recess: Taking the 5th Grade (United States)
 December 13 - Hamtaro: Miracle in Aurora Valley (Japan)
 December 19:
 The 3 Wise Men (France and Spain)
 El Cid: The Legend (Spain)
 Toto Sapore and the Magic Story of Pizza (Italy)
 December 20:
 InuYasha the Movie: Swords of an Honorable Ruler (Japan)
 Master Q: Incredible Pet Detective (Hong Kong)
 December 21 - Nasu: Summer in Andalusia (Japan)
 December 25 - Bolívar: el héroe (Colombia)
 December 26 - Captain Sabertooth (Norway)
 December 31 - LeapFrog: The Talking Words Factory (United States)
 Specific date unknown:
 The Return of Mushsnail: The Legend of The Snowmill (United States)
 The Souricière (France)

Television series debuts

Television series endings

Births

January
 January 2: Cyrus Arnold, American actor (voice of Jawbreaker in Transformers: EarthSpark, Teen Driver in Diary of a Wimpy Kid).
 January 24: Johnny Orlando, Canadian actor and musician (voice of Whyatt in season 3 of Super Why!, Travis in Bunyan and Babe).

February
February 1: Sydney Mikayla, American actress (voice of Wolf in Kipo and the Age of Wonderbeasts, Robby Malto in Transformers: EarthSpark, Maya in Craig of the Creek, Joy in The Loud House, Kit in the We Bare Bears episode "Baby Bears Can't Jump").
February 4: Kyla Kenedy, American actress (voice of Piper in If You Give a Mouse a Cookie).

April
 April 19: Caleel Harris, American actor (voice of AJ in Blaze and the Monster Machines, Clyde McBride in seasons 1-3 of The Loud House).

June 
 June 11: Breanna Yde, American actress (voice of Ronnie Anne in seasons 1-3 of The Loud House, Little Mariah in All I Want for Christmas Is You).

August 
 August 18: Max Charles, American actor (voice of Sherman in Mr. Peabody & Sherman and The Mr. Peabody & Sherman Show, the title character in Harvey Beaks, Kion in The Lion Guard).

September
 September 3: Jack Dylan Grazer, American actor (voice of Alberto Scorfano in Luca, Barney Pudowski in Ron's Gone Wrong).
 September 5: Philip Solomon, American actor (voice of Craig Williams in Craig of the Creek).
 September 17: Brianna Denski, American actress (voice of June Bailey in Wonder Park).
 September 30: 
 Bella Ramsey, English actress (voice of the title character in Hilda, young Ramona in the Summer Camp Island episode "Ghost Baby Jabberwock").
 Lyric Ross, American actress (voice of Kat Elliot in Wendell & Wild).

Deaths

February
 February 24: Imogene Lynn, American singer (singing voice of Red in Tex Avery's cartoons), dies at age 80.
 February 27: Fred Rogers, American television host, author, producer and minister (voiced himself in the Arthur episode "Arthur Meets Mister Rogers"), dies from stomach cancer at age 74.

March
 March 9: Stan Brakhage, American film director and animator (Mothlight), dies at age 70.
 March 12:
 Lynne Thigpen, American actress (voice of Luna in Bear in the Big Blue House, Judge in the King of the Hill episode "Hank's Dirty Laundry"), dies from cerebral hemorrhage at age 54.
 Branco Karabajic, Croatian comic book artist and animator (worked on Veliki Mitting), dies at age 77.
 Thomas Warkentin, American comic book artist, comic book writer and animator (Filmation, Warner Bros. Animation), dies at age 67.
 March 23: Nelda Ridley, American animation checker (Bakshi Animation, Hanna-Barbera, Cartoon Network Studios), dies at age 65.
 March 28: Bob Matz, American animator (Warner Bros. Cartoons, DePatie-Freleng, Peanuts specials), dies at age 90.

April
 April 15: Maurice Rapf, American screenwriter (Song of the South, So Dear to My Heart, Alice in Wonderland, Gnomes), dies at age 88.
 April 16: David Brown, American businessman (co-founder of Blue Sky Studios), dies at age 64.
 April 20: Johnny Douglas, English composer (Marvel Productions), dies at age 82.
 April 24: Gary Sperling, American television writer (Disney Television Animation), dies at age 45.
 April 30: Lionel Wilson, American actor (voiced all characters in Tom Terrific, Vincent van Gopher and Possible Possum in Deputy Dawg, Eustace Bagge in Courage the Cowardly Dog), dies at age 79.

May
 May 11: Joe Denton, American background artist (Ghostbusters, She-Ra: Princess of Power, Warner Bros. Animation) and storyboard artist (Camp Candy, Warner Bros. Animation, Jumanji, Sabrina: The Animated Series, Family Guy), dies at age 65.
 May 14: Robert Stack, American actor (voice of Ultra Magnus in The Transformers: The Movie, ATF Agent Fleming in Beavis and Butt-Head Do America, Bob the Narrator in Hercules, Superintendent in Recess: School's Out, Stoat Muldoon in Butt-Ugly Martians, General in the Recess episode "A Genius Among Us", the Narrator in The Angry Beavers episode "Home Loners", Reynolds Penland in the King of the Hill episode "The Trouble with Gribbles", Gordon/The Silver Shield in the Teamo Supremo episode "The Grandfather Show"), dies from heart failure at age 84.
 May 27: Dave Monahan, American screenwriter (Warner Bros. Cartoons), dies at age 85.

June
 June 30: Buddy Hackett, American actor and comedian (voice of Pardon-Me-Pete in Jack Frost, Scuttle in The Little Mermaid), dies at age 78.

July
 July 4: Barry White, American singer and songwriter (voice of Samson and Brother Bear in Coonskin, himself in The Simpsons episodes "Whacking Day" and "Krusty Gets Kancelled"), dies from cardiac arrest at age 58.
 July 27: Bob Hope, English-American comedian, vaudevillian, actor, singer and dancer (voiced himself in The Simpsons episode "Lisa the Beauty Queen"), dies from pneumonia at age 100.
 July 31: Guido Crepax, Italian comics artist and animator, dies at age 70.

August
 August 9: Gregory Hines, American dancer, actor, choreographer and singer (voice of Big Bill in Little Bill), dies from liver cancer at age 57.
 August 24: Robert C. Bruce, American actor (narrator of various Looney Tunes and Merrie Melodies cartoons), dies at age 88.

September
 September 6:
 Jules Engel, American sculptor, graphic artist, set designer, animator, film director (Walt Disney Animation Studios, Charles Mintz Studios, UPA) and founder of the Experimental Animation Program at CalArts), dies at age 94.
 Harry Goz, American actor (voice of Mayor Huffenmeier in Buster & Chauncey's Silent Night, Captain Hazel "Hank" Murphy in Sealab 2021), dies from multiple myeloma at age 71.
 September 8: Jaclyn Linetsky, Canadian actress (voice of the title character in Caillou, Meg in Mega Babies, second voice of Lori in What's with Andy?), dies in a car accident at age 17.
 September 11: John Ritter, American actor (voice of Peter Dickinson in The Flight of Dragons, Inspector Gil in Fish Police, Eugene Grandy in King of the Hill, the title character in Clifford the Big Red Dog and Clifford's Really Big Movie, Great Uncle Stew in Stanley's Dinosaur Round-Up, Dr. David Wheeler in the Batman Beyond episode "The Last Resort"), dies at age 54.
 September 12: Johnny Cash, American country singer (voice of the Space Coyote in The Simpsons episode "El Viaje Misterioso de Nuestro Jomer"), dies at age 71.
 September 25: George Plimpton, American journalist, writer, literary editor, actor and occasional amateur sportsman (voiced himself in The Simpsons episode "I'm Spelling as Fast as I Can"), dies at age 76.
 September 29: Wesley Tuttle, American country singer (did the yodeling in Snow White and the Seven Dwarfs), dies at age 85.
 September 30: Edwin Gillette, American inventor, cameraman and animator (Cambria Studios, inventor of the Syncro-Vox technique), dies at age 94.

October
 October 3: Florence Stanley, American actress (voice of Mrs. Packard in Atlantis: The Lost Empire and Atlantis: Milo's Return, Waitress in A Goofy Movie), dies from a stroke at age 79.
 October 16: Carl Urbano, American animator and director (A Is for Atom, Hanna-Barbera), dies at age 92.
 October 26: Ted C. Bemiller, American animation checker, camera operator (Crusader Rabbit, Hanna-Barbera, The Beatles, MGM Animation/Visual Arts, Filmation, Who Framed Roger Rabbit, The Simpsons, Looney Tunes), cinematographer (Fritz the Cat) and production manager (Garfield and Friends), dies at age 79.
 October 27: Rod Roddy, American radio and television announcer (voice of Mike the Microphone in House of Mouse, Johnny in the Garfield and Friends episode "Over the Rainbow"), dies from colon cancer at age 66.

November
 November 12: Penny Singleton, American actress and labor leader (voice of Jane Jetson in The Jetsons), dies at age 95.
 November 18: Michael Kamen, American composer, orchestral arranger, orchestral conductor, songwriter and session musician (The Iron Giant), dies from a heart attack at age 55.
 November 30: Kin Platt, American caricaturist, radio writer, television writer, comics artist and animation writer (Walt Disney Animation, Hanna-Barbera, Terrytoons, Milton the Monster), dies at age 91.

December
 December 17: Alan Tilvern, English actor (portrayed R.K. Maroon in Who Framed Roger Rabbit, voice of Innkeeper in The Lord of the Rings), dies at age 85.
 December 19: Les Tremayne, English actor (voice of The Ghost of Christmas Present in Mr. Magoo's Christmas Carol, Humbug in The Phantom Tollbooth, Chester C. Cricket and Harry Cat in The Cricket in Times Square, A Very Merry Cricket, and Yankee Doodle Cricket, Alexander Graham Wolf, and Santa Claus in Raggedy Ann and Andy in The Great Santa Claus Caper, the title character in Raggedy Ann and Andy in The Pumpkin Who Couldn't Smile, the Wishing Well in Daffy Duck's Movie: Fantastic Island, Orin in Rainbow Brite and the Star Stealer, Arthur in Starchaser: The Legend of Orin, Gustav in Tis the Season to Be Smurfy), dies at age 90.
 December 22: Wah Chang, Chinese-American designer, sculptor, animator and animation producer (Pinocchio, Bambi), dies at age 86. 
 December 27: Pete Alvarado, American comics artist and animator (Walt Disney Company, Warner Bros. Cartoons, DePatie-Freleng, Republic Pictures, Hanna-Barbera, Ruby-Spears Productions, Filmation), dies at age 83.
 Specific date unknown: Oliver Passingham, British comics artist and animator, dies at age 78.

Specific date unknown
 Claude Smith, American animator (Walt Disney Animation Studios, MGM), dies at age 90.

See also
2003 in anime

References

External links 
Animated works of the year, listed in the IMDb

 
2000s in animation